Caldea is a spa resort in Escaldes-Engordany, Andorra.

Finished in 1994, it has 18 floors. At 6,000m² it is one of Europe's largest spas, and at 80 metres in height, it is Andorra's tallest building.

References

External links
Official website 

Hotels in Andorra
Spas
Buildings and structures completed in 1994
Escaldes-Engordany